Arsenaria dattinii is a species of snout moth in the genus Arsenaria. It was described by Ragonot in 1887, and is known from Tunisia and Palestine.

References

Moths described in 1887
Hypotiini
Moths of Africa
Moths of the Middle East